Abu Abd Allah Salm ibn Qutayba ibn Muslim al-Bahili was an 8th-century Arab who served as governor and military commander for both the Umayyad and Abbasid caliphates.

Salm was the son of the distinguished Bahili general Qutayba ibn Muslim, who as governor of Khurasan conquered Transoxiana for the Umayyad Caliphate. 

According to al-Tabari, when Yusuf ibn Umar became governor of Iraq in 738, he considered making Salm governor of Khurasan, but Caliph Hisham ibn Abd al-Malik rejected his choice, and Nasr ibn Sayyar was appointed instead. During the civil war, he served as governor of Basra under Yazid ibn Umar ibn Hubayra. In September/October 749, as the forces of the Abbasid Revolution entered Iraq, the Abbasid commander al-Hasan ibn Qahtaba appointed Sufyan ibn Mu'awiya ibn Yazid ibn al-Muhallab as governor over Basra and sent him to take over the city. Salm, aided by the troops of the Qays and Mudar at his disposal, confronted the advance guard under Sufyan's son Mu'awiyah, who was killed. Sufyan then abandoned his march on Basra. Salm retained control of the city until he received news of Yazid ibn Umar's death, whereupon he abandoned it.

After the establishment of the Abbasid Caliphate in 750, Salm served under Caliph al-Mansur as governor of Rayy and Basra. During the Alid revolt of 762–763 he served as governor of Rayy, and was asked by al-Mansur to come to assist in suppressing the uprising. In 763, he was appointed governor of Basra, keeping his post until his replacement by Muhammad ibn Sulayman ibn Ali during the next year (146 AH, 763/4 CE). He died in 766.

His sons, Amr, Muthanna, Sa'id, Ibrahim, and Kathir, and their offspring, continued to occupy several high offices as governors and military commanders in the early Abbasid regime.

References

Sources
 
 
 
 
 
 

766 deaths
8th-century Arabs
8th-century people from the Abbasid Caliphate
8th-century people from the Umayyad Caliphate
Abbasid governors of Basra
Governors of Ray
Governors of the Abbasid Caliphate
Bahila
People of the Abbasid Revolution
People of the Third Fitna
Umayyad governors of Basra